Alain Dessauvage is a Belgian film editor. His editing credits include Moscow, Belgium (2008), Oxygen (2010), Frits and Freddy (2010), Comrade Kim Goes Flying (2012), The Resurrection of a Bastard (2013), The Ardennes (2015), Couple in a Hole (2015), Flemish Heaven (2016), Racer and the Jailbird (2017), and Girl (2018). He received the Magritte Award for Best Editing for his work on Bullhead (2011).

Selected filmography 
 2008: Aanrijding in Moscou
 2009: Limo
 2010: Adem
 2010: Frits & Freddy
 2011: Rundskop
 2012: Offline
 2012: Comrade Kim Goes Flying
 2013: De wederopstanding van een klootzak
 2013: Brasserie Romantiek
 2013: Hemel op aarde
 2014: Trouw met mij!
 2015: The Sky Above Us
 2015: Couple In A Hole
 2015: D'Ardennen
 2016: Le Ciel Flamand
 2017: Le Fidèle ( Racer_and_the_Jailbird)
 2018: Girl
 2018: De Patrick
 2020: The Silencing

References

External links

Belgian film editors
Living people
Magritte Award winners
Year of birth missing (living people)